Iona is an unincorporated community and census-designated place (CDP) in Lee County, Florida, United States. The population was 16,908 at the 2020 census, up from 15,404 at the 2010 census. It is part of the Cape Coral-Fort Myers, Florida Metropolitan Statistical Area.

A strong EF2 tornado struck the town on January 16, 2022, causing major damage and injuring three people.

Geography
Iona is located in southwestern Lee County at  (26.510,-81.959). It is bordered to the west by Punta Rassa, to the east by Harlem Heights, and to the northeast by McGregor. Its northern boundary is the tidal Caloosahatchee River, across which is the city of Cape Coral. The southern edge of the community is Summerlin Road (County Road 869). McGregor Boulevard crosses the community from northeast to southwest.

Demographics

As of the census of 2000, there were 11,756 people, 6,023 households, and 3,740 families residing in the CDP. The racial makeup of the CDP was 97.47% White, 0.41% African American, 0.17% Native American, 0.48% Asian, 0.01% Pacific Islander, 0.83% from other races, and 0.63% from two or more races. Hispanic or Latino of any race were 3.94% of the population.

There were 6,023 households, out of which 11.2% had children under the age of 18 living with them, 54.9% were married couples living together, 5.1% had a female householder with no husband present, and 37.9% were non-families. 31.4% of all households were made up of individuals, and 17.0% had someone living alone who was 65 years of age or older.  The average household size was 1.95 and the average family size was 2.36.

In the CDP, the population was spread out, with 10.2% under the age of 18, 3.6% from 18 to 24, 17.6% from 25 to 44, 29.1% from 45 to 64, and 39.5% who were 65 years of age or older.  The median age was 59 years. For every 100 females, there were 91.5 males.  For every 100 females age 18 and over, there were 90.2 males.

The median income for a household in the CDP was $37,091, and the median income for a family was $46,250. Males had a median income of $34,740 versus $25,683 for females. The per capita income for the CDP was $33,937.  About 5.9% of families and 10.0% of the population were below the poverty line, including 17.6% of those under age 18 and 4.7% of those age 65 or over.

References

Census-designated places in Lee County, Florida
Census-designated places in Florida